Hatey Bazarey or Hate Bazare (Bengali: হাটে বাজারে; English: The Market Place) is a 1967 award-winning art film by noted Bengali director Tapan Sinha and produced Asim Dutta, the story revolves around the conflict between good and evil. The film stars Ashok Kumar, Vyjayanthimala (in her first Bengali venture) and Ajitesh Bandopadhyay in the lead with Bhanu Bandopadhyay, Samit Bhanja, Rudraprasad Sengupta and Gita Dey as the ensemble cast of the film. The film was produced by Priya Entertainment Production Limited owned by Asim Dutta.

Plot
Dr. Anaadi Mukherjee (Ashok Kumar) is the civil surgeon in a small tribal-dominated market town in Birbhum. He is a god-like figure, loved and respected by both the poor tribal folks of the area like the beautiful young widow Chhipli (Vyjayanthimala), Jagadamba the vegetable seller and old women like Komlididi and Nani (Chhaya Devi) and the bigwigs of the area like the District Magistrate and Superintendent of Police Mr. Pandey. Dr. Mukherjee is a workaholic and lives with his young wife Manu, who has a chronic heart ailment. He comes into conflict with Lacchmanlal (Ajitesh Bannerjee), the son of the local feudal lord Chhabilal, a veritable rogue who lusts after Chhipli, who is protected by the good doctor. After the death of his wife Manu, Dr. Mukherjee leaves his official job and utilizes his savings to start a mobile dispensary for the poor. Lacchmanlal gets irritated by his actions and spreads canards about Dr Mukherjee's relationship with Chhipli, who had been appointed as trainee nurse in the medical team. On the night of a tribal festival, Lacchmanlal tricks Chhipli into a tryst and attempts to rape her. Dr. Mukherjee gets the news and in a fight with Lacchmanlal strangles the villain to death while getting mortally injured. The next morning he dies, but the work of the clinic is carried on by Chhipli and others of the team under the guidance of a young doctor who had earlier been reprimanded by Dr. Mukherjee.

Cast
 Ashok Kumar as Dr. Anaadi Mukherjee
 Vyjayanthimala as Chhipli
 Ajitesh Bandopadhyay as Lacchmanlal
 Rudraprasad Sengupta
 Chhaya Devi as Nani 
 Samit Bhanja
 Gita Dey as Mrs. Pandey in a guest appearance
 Chinmoy Roy
 Samita Biswas
 Partho Mukerjee

Music
Cheye Thaki Cheye Thaki - Vyjayanthimala and Mrinal Chakraborty

Inspiration
This film's story was based on a novel written by Banaphool with the same name. The novel won several awards including Rabindra Puraskar Award in 1962.

Box office
The film was one of the most successful Bengali films of the 1960s.

Awards

References

External links

Hatey Bazarey profile at Upperstall.com
 - Vyjayanthimala sings in her own voice

1967 films
Bengali-language Indian films
Indian black-and-white films
Films directed by Tapan Sinha
Best Feature Film National Film Award winners
1960s Bengali-language films
Films based on works by Balai Chand Mukhopadhyay